"Woohoo" is a song by American singer Christina Aguilera featuring rapper Nicki Minaj. The song was written by Aguilera, Onika Maraj, Claude Kelly, Ester Dean and Jamal "Polow da Don" Jones, and produced by Polow da Don, for Aguilera's sixth studio album, Bionic (2010). "Woohoo" was serviced to rhythmic contemporary crossover airplay as the album's second radio single on May 25, 2010. The song, which samples the 1972 song "Add már uram az esőt" by Hungarian singer Kati Kovács, is about oral sex. 

"Woohoo" has been described as an electro-R&B and dancehall track. The song received mixed to positive reviews from critics, some of whom praised Minaj's appearance and Aguilera's vocals. However, others expressed distaste for the song's sexual nature. "Woohoo" debuted and peaked at 46 and 79 in Canada and the United States, respectively. Aguilera performed the song in a medley with "Bionic" and "Not Myself Tonight" at the 2010 MTV Movie Awards. The song was later included in the setlist for Aguilera's Vegas residency Christina Aguilera: The Xperience and her 2018 stage comeback — The Liberation Tour.

Composition

 "Woohoo" was written by Aguilera, Maraj, Claude Kelly, Ester Dean and Polow da Don. The song is an electro, R&B and dancehall track. Aguilera's vocals are distorted in parts. "Woohoo" contains a sample from the Hungarian song "Add már uram az esőt", originally sung by the Hungarian singer Kati Kovács in 1972. The song's chorus has been described as "shouty" and "sing-song".  Rob Harvilla of The Village Voice noted that the song sounded like a mix of "Milkshake" and "Lip Gloss" with "electro synths". The song is about oral sex, and has been called a "humorous ode to cunnilingus" by music critic Alim Kheraj.

Critical reception
"Woohoo" received mixed to positive reviews from critics; most of them commended Aguilera's vocals and Minaj's appearance. However, others were not impressed with the song's sexual nature. Sara D. Anderson of AOL Music said the "provocative, dancehall track nicely fuses Aguilera's powerful voice with Minaj's MC tactics". Benjamin Boles of Now Magazine called the track the top track on Bionic, commenting that Minaj's cameo "rescues" the song. Alexis Petridis of The Guardian said, "If you're going to do a five-minute song about cunnilingus, it's a good idea to enlist foul-mouthed rapper Nicki Minaj, whose bug-eyed contribution lends the proceedings an air of gripping abandon." Chris Ryan of MTV Buzzworthy called the song "sexually explicit, funky club pop", saying "In Nicki Minaj, Aguilera has found the perfect partner for her erotic-pop adventures". He also called the song a "dirtier cousin of Rihanna's 'Rude Boy' or 'Hollaback Girl'", and commended Minaj's verse.

Becky Bain of Idolator said the song's "catchiness" was "miles ahead" of "Not Myself Tonight", also compared it to "Hollaback Girl". Bain also said, "If there's one person who can match Christina Aguilera's naughtiness, it's Nicki Minaj, so these two pretty much make a perfect pair for this type of song." Stephen Thomas Erlewine of AllMusic said the track had an "incessant title loop piercing like a dental drill" and said it "doesn't work as temptation". He also commented "her crassness is no longer alienating as it was on Stripped". Michael Cragg of musicOMH also compared the song to dental work, commenting that the song, "which is about oral sex but is about as sexy as going to the dentist." Genevieve Koski of The A.V. Club called the song "already-passé electro trash." In his retrospective commentary on the album Bionic, Billboard'''s Glenn Rowley called "Woohoo" a "raunchy banger", and Mike Wass of Idolator shared a similar sentiment: "'Woohoo' is arguably the most iconic bop ever recorded about female genitalia". According to the Gay Times writer Daniel Megarry, Nicki Minaj's verse in the song "happens to be" one of the very best efforts of her career.Attitude opined that the song is "not subtle, but it is fun". Entertainment-related website Tan's Topic called "Woohoo" a "classic sexual Christina track with a 'Dirrty' dancehall vibe and plenty of naughty lyrics", as well as the "'Candyman' of the 21st century". The Tab's Harrison Brocklehurst ranked "Woohoo" among Aguilera's greatest singles and labelled it as "bratty pop perfection". He further noted that the song is "a weird, hand-clappy masterpiece that’s aged marvellously".

Chart performance
In its first week of release, "Woohoo" debuted at 46 on the Canadian Hot 100, and 79 on the Billboard Hot 100. The song became Aguilera's 15th straight single to hit both charts, keeping her streak of having all of her singles chart on the Billboard Hot 100. The song fell off both charts the following week. However, due to increased digital sales after her performance at the 2010 MTV Movie Awards and the release of Bionic, the song re-entered the Billboard Hot 100 at number 99. The song also charted at number 148 on the UK Singles Chart after the release of Bionic. In June 2010, "Woohoo" entered the Gaon Digital Chart in South Korea at number twenty-seven.

Promotion
There were plans to shoot a music video for the song but those were scrapped. Stevie Boi was set to direct the video before it was cancelled.

Live performances
Aguilera sang a portion of the song, alongside "Bionic" and "Not Myself Tonight", at the 2010 MTV Movie Awards. During "Woohoo", the last of the set, Aguilera and her backup dancers removed their leather capes and revealing painted red hearts on their groins, ending with Aguilera's LED heart glowing. James Montgomery of MTV News referred to the song as a "seriously sexy dance number." Montgomery described the performance's ending, stating, "Not to be outdone, Aguilera ended things by standing tall at center stage, the camera zooming in on her midsection, which now bore a beating heart of its own."

Most critics were not impressed with the medley, comparing it to Aguilera's identity during the Bionic era. Tamar Anitai, also of MTV Buzzworthy'' summarized the performance saying it "was all about her "I-I'm-still-a-diva" vocals, frenzied stage show, and adult-only innuendo...And then this happened." She went on to comment also sarcastically, "This is so just Christina Aguilera's way of saying she loves you! And that the diminutive diva still has a sense of humor....It's like a little knowing wink that assures you that when she's not changing diapers and doing mommy stuff, Mamaguilera's hanging out at dance party sex dungeons and wailing from the bottom of her light-up hoo-ha. She is DEFINITELY not the same girl who once bopped around on the Disney Channel in a Scrunchie."

The song was later included in the setlist for Aguilera's Vegas residency Christina Aguilera: The Xperience and her 2018 Liberation Tour.
In September 2021, the singer performed "Woohoo" during the LadyLand Festival in New York.

Credits and personnel
Songwriting – Christina Aguilera, Onika Maraj, Claude Kelly, Ester Dean, Polow da Don
Production –  Polow da Don
Vocal production — additional by Claude Kelly
Mixing – Jaycen Joshua, assisted by Giancarlo Lino
Engineering – assistant, Matt Benefield
Recording — Josh Mosser and Jeremy Stevenson
Vocal recording — Oscar Ramirez
Source

Charts

Weekly charts

Year-end charts

Release history

References

2010 singles
2010 songs
Christina Aguilera songs
Nicki Minaj songs
RCA Records singles
Song recordings produced by Polow da Don
Songs written by Christina Aguilera
Songs written by Claude Kelly
Songs written by Ester Dean
Songs written by Nicki Minaj
Songs written by Polow da Don
Dancehall songs